Steve Evans (born 26 April 1976) is a South African former field hockey player who competed in the 2004 Summer Olympics.

References

External links

1976 births
Living people
South African male field hockey players
Olympic field hockey players of South Africa
Field hockey players at the 2004 Summer Olympics
Field hockey players at the 2002 Commonwealth Games
Commonwealth Games competitors for South Africa